Parnasree Pally is an upscale locality of Behala in southern Kolkata, India. It was included in the Kolkata Municipal Corporation in 1985. Translated to English the name means "beauty of the leaves". It was earlier known as Halderbagan (The Halders were probably the priests of Sabarna Roy Chowdhury family). The name Parnasree (Beauty of the Leaves) was coined by Late Asoke Ratan Mazumder when he became the member of the Co Operative Society formed for the rehabilitation of Refugees during Partition of India in 1947.

Formation of Parnasree Palli

In 1941 as war preparation began in India for Japanese invasion, a land locally known as Halder Bagan was acquired by the then government for building an air strip. One "Anti Air Craft" Gun was also installed  there. After war was over this land was taken over by Central Government and handed over partly to Calcutta Port Trust and partly to local government. 
After Independence Dr. B.C.Roy (Bidhan Chandra Roy - the first Chief Minister of West Bengal) ordered Land and Land Revenue to disburse the land usefully by the side of present Taratola Road there was a low marshy land which was filled by a company who were  entrusted to fill Salt Lake later. As a work sample they filled up that low-lying area. 
Now coming back to Parnasree episode – For East Bengal refugees the Bengal Government announced a cooperative society to be set up so as to develop a habitable planned township under guidance of municipal norms of South Suburban Municipality . Land and Land Revenue department set up a steering committee headed by Mr. Amal Home of Hindusthan Insurance Company (later  L I C I )as Chairman, Mr. Kshitindra  Mohan Sen, Ex-Director of Customs, Mr. Mahendra Kumar De, Dr. Rukmini Dutta Roy, Educationist, Mr. M. L. Dhar, Lawyer, Mr. Nikhil Adhikari of United Bank of India. The chamber of Mr. M.L.Dhar at Dover Lane was the first office of this cooperative society in September 1948. The scenario was- New Alipore township with large plots having modern facilities like sewerage, water connection, metal road, electrified streets etc. were  being promoted by Hindusthan. Many employees of Hindusthan missed the chance of getting a plot in New Alipore for its high price . 
Now many Hindusthan employees along with their friends, rushed to the office of the new project office and enquired about the modus operandi of the project. At that point the Name of the co-operative was suggested by  Mr. Asoke Ratan Mazumder as PARNASREE PALLY SAMABAY  SAMITI and suggestion was accepted by voice vote. Immediately Mr. Dhar arranged for the registration with that name. 
In October 1948 share selling of co-operative started. It was decided that the share holding  pattern will be Rs.100/- per person, with a sub clause that a person can pay Rs.50/- and balance Rs. 50/- within six calendar months. 
The survey was conducted by Mr. Robin Routh and site plan was planned . Low-lying areas were filled up by digging ponds. The developed lands were gradually handed over to PARNASREE PALLY SAMABAY SAMITI and distributed to the share holders with Rs. 500/-for municipal mutation. Many deed of conveyance with Govt of West Bengal were done at stipulated price later.

PRESENT DAY

The local dhobis of Parnasree are supposed to be the oldest residents of the area. They can still be found in the Dhopapara area of Parnasree which consists of two to three houses. The area of Parnasree has quite few banks namely the State Bank of India, Punjab National Bank (formerly United Bank of India), Allahabad Bank, Axis Bank, Bank of Baroda, HDFC Bank besides a few ATMs of other banks. The area also is home to the Parnasree Palli Post Office which constitutes Kolkata 700060. A 40 feet wide road runs around the core area of Parnasree. It comes out at the junction of Banamali Naskar Road and Upen Banerjee Road and it merges back into Upen Banerjee Road at RIC More (Crossing). The area has got a vibrant bus station where bus routes of 13, S4, S4D, AC4, AC4A, E4, VS-4, Parnasree Howrah Mini bus terminate. Parnasree Pally is situated very close to the Behala Airport, which is to be converted to an airport to serve as an air traffic hub for Bengal and for other regional traffic.

Geography

Police district
Parnashree police station is part of the South West division of Kolkata Police. Located at Ward Health Unit, Upen Banerjee Road, Block-
14 Parnasree Pally, Kolkata-700060, it has jurisdiction over the area which is bounded on the north by Taratala police station; on the east by Behala police station; on the south by Thakurpukur police station; and on the west by Mahestala police station.

Behala Women police station, located at the same address as Behala Police Station, covers all police stations under the jurisdiction of the South West division i.e. Sarsuna, Taratala, Behala, Parnasree, Thakurpukur and Haridevpur.

Jadavpur, Thakurpukur, Behala, Purba Jadavpur, Tiljala, Regent Park, Metiabruz, Nadial and Kasba police stations were transferred from South 24 Parganas to Kolkata in 2011. Except Metiabruz, all the police stations were split into two. The new police stations are Parnasree, Haridevpur, Garfa, Patuli, Survey Park, Pragati Maidan, Bansdroni and Rajabagan.

Transport 

Parnasree Pally can be accessed from Taratala Crossing by taking the Budge Budge Road and also from the road opposite Behala Police Station.

Educational institutions
 Parnasree Vidyamandir H. S. School
 Sharada Vidyapith  for girls
 Behala College
 Behala Government Polytechnic College
 Holy Cross Mission School
 Sishu Bharati Uccha Bidyamandir
 Behala Boys High School
 Alankrita Tutorials and Alankrita Careers.
 Kidzee
Eurokids
 Pathfinder
 Path creator
Sikkhan.

External links

References

Neighbourhoods in Kolkata